Purakkad is a village in Alappuzha district in the Indian state of Kerala. It is the beach which is described in Thakazhi's novel "Chemeen".

History
There was an ancient port at Purakkad. Purakkad was known as Burkkare in ancient time. It is possibly mentioned by Pliny under the name Barace. Foreign traders used to stay in the place and bought  local produces like black pepper. 
The literal meaning of Purakkad is "out of forest". The first Battle of Purakkad took place in 1746 between Travancore and combined forces of Odanad. village of Purakkad was the also scene of battles between Travancore and Cochin forces in 1754 AD and between Travancore and Zamorin forces in 1756 AD. The Dutch East India Company had a factory at that time. A crucifix was presented by Dutch seafarers who landed on Purakkad beach when their ship was lost at sea in a terrible storm. The crucifix has never been repaired since all these years. Now the church housing the crucifix faces demolition threat because of road widening plans.

Demographics
 India census, Purakkad has a population of 27912 with 13751 males and 14161 females. Male literacy rate is 96% and the female literacy rate is 90%.

Places of interest
Sree Venu Gopala Swamy Temple of Purakkad is one of the oldest temples that belong to Goud Saraswat Brahmins. The temple was built more than 400 years ago with the help of Chembakassery Raja, when a group of Goud Saraswat Brahmins migrated from Goa. A famous shrine of the Muslim community is also situated here. The Holy Cross Church, founded in 1410, was renewed as Mar Sleeva Church in 2015.

Chakara
The coast of Purakkad experiences a natural phenomenon called Chakara during monsoon season.

References

4. Mar sleeva church

Villages in Alappuzha district